Marquess of Ripon, in the County of York was a title in the Peerage of the United Kingdom. It was created in 1871 for the Liberal politician George Robinson, 2nd Earl of Ripon.

History
The Robinson family descended from William Robinson (d. 1616), a wealthy York merchant, Lord Mayor and Member of Parliament for York. His grandson Sir William Robinson also represented York in Parliament and served as High Sheriff of Yorkshire in 1638. Sir William's elder son Metcalfe Robinson sat as Member of Parliament for York and was created a Baronet in 1660 (see Robinson Baronets). He died childless in 1689 when the baronetcy became extinct. The title was revived in the following year when his nephew William Robinson was created a Baronet, of Newby in the County of York, in the Baronetage of England. Sir William represented both Northallerton and York in Parliament. His eldest son Metcalfe, the second Baronet, only survived him by four days and was succeeded by his younger brother, Tancred, the third Baronet. He was a Rear-Admiral in the Royal Navy. This line of the family failed on the death of his younger son, the fifth Baronet, in 1792.

The late Baronet was succeeded by his first cousin once removed, Thomas Robinson, 3rd Baron Grantham, who became the sixth Baronet. He was the grandson of Thomas Robinson, fourth son of the first Baronet. Thomas Robinson was a prominent diplomat and politician and served as Ambassador to the Austrian Empire, as Secretary of State for the Southern Department and as Leader of the House of Commons. In 1761 he was created Baron Grantham, of Grantham in the County of Lincoln, in the Peerage of Great Britain. He was succeeded by his eldest son, the second Baron. He was also a successful diplomat and politician and served as Ambassador to Spain and as Foreign Secretary. Lord Grantham married Lady Mary Jemima, daughter of Philip Yorke, 2nd Earl of Hardwicke and Jemima Yorke, 2nd Marchioness Grey and 4th Baroness Lucas, granddaughter of Henry Grey, 1st Duke of Kent.

He was succeeded by his elder son Thomas, the aforementioned third Baron. In 1803 Thomas assumed the surname of Weddell in lieu of his patronymic. In 1833 he succeeded his maternal aunt as 2nd Earl de Grey and 6th Baron Lucas. His aunt Lady Amabel (or Annabella) Yorke had succeeded her mother the Marchioness Grey (on whose death the marquessate became extinct) in the barony of Lucas in 1797 and in 1816 she was created Countess de Grey, of Wrest in the County of Bedford, in the Peerage of the United Kingdom, with remainder to her sister Lady Mary Jemima and the heirs male of her body. Lady de Grey was the childless widow of Alexander Hume-Campbell, Lord Polwarth, son of Hugh Hume-Campbell, 3rd Earl of Marchmont. Thomas, the second Earl de Grey, also inherited the Grey family seat of Wrest Park, near Silsoe, Bedfordshire. The same year he succeeded in the earldom he assumed by Royal licence the surname of de Grey in lieu of Weddell.

Lord de Grey had no sons and was succeeded in the barony of Lucas (which could be passed on through female lines) by his daughter, Anne (see Baron Lucas for further history of this title). He was succeeded in the other titles by his nephew, George Robinson, 2nd Earl of Ripon. He was the only son of the Honourable F. J. Robinson, second son of the second Baron Grantham. F. J. Robinson was Chancellor of the Exchequer between 1823 and 1827 and served briefly as Prime Minister of the United Kingdom between August 1827 and January 1828. In 1827 he was elevated to the Peerage of the United Kingdom as Viscount Goderich, of Nocton in the County of Lincoln. This was a revival of the viscountcy of Goderich created for his great-great-grandfather the Duke of Kent in 1706. In 1833 Robinson was further honoured when he was made Earl of Ripon, in the County of Kent in the Peerage of the United Kingdom. On his death in 1859 he was succeeded by his only son, the aforementioned second Earl of Ripon. The latter also succeeded his uncle in the earldom of de Grey later in 1859, whereby he became known by style the "Earl de Grey and Ripon". He was a distinguished Liberal statesman and held office in every Liberal administration from 1861 until his death in 1908. In 1871 he was created Marquess of Ripon, in the County of York in the Peerage of the United Kingdom. He was succeeded by his only son and only surviving child, the second Marquess. He represented Ripon in Parliament between 1874 and 1880. He was childless and all the titles became extinct on his death in 1923.  The second Marquess was regarded as the finest shot of his generation.

The family seats were Wrest Park in Bedfordshire, Newby Hall and Studley Royal Park in Yorkshire

Robinson Baronets, of Newby (1690) 
Sir William Robinson, 1st Baronet (1655–1736)
Sir Metcalfe Robinson, 2nd Baronet (c. 1683–1736)
Sir Tancred Robinson, 3rd Baronet (c. 1685–1754)
Sir William Robinson, 4th Baronet (1713–1770)
Sir Norton Robinson, 5th Baronet (c. 1715–1792)
Thomas Philip Robinson, 3rd Baron Grantham (1781–1859)

Barons Grantham (1761) 
 Thomas Robinson, 1st Baron Grantham (c. 1695–1770)
 Thomas Robinson, 2nd Baron Grantham (1738–1786)
 Thomas Philip Robinson, 3rd Baron Grantham (1781–1859) (succeeded as 2nd Earl de Grey in 1833)

Earls de Grey (1816)
Amabel Yorke, 1st Countess De Grey (1751–1833)
Thomas Philip De Grey, 2nd Earl De Grey (1781–1859)
George Frederick Samuel Robinson, 3rd Earl De Grey, 1st Marquess of Ripon (1827–1909)

Viscount Goderich (1827) 
 Frederick John Robinson, 1st Viscount Goderich; created Earl of Ripon in 1833 (1782–1859)

Earls of Ripon (1833) 
 Frederick John Robinson, 1st Earl of Ripon (1782–1859)
 George Frederick Samuel Robinson, 2nd Earl of Ripon (1827–1909) (succeeded as 4th Baron Grantham and 3rd Earl de Grey in 1859; created Marquess of Ripon in 1871)

Marquesses of Ripon (1871) 
 George Frederick Samuel Robinson, 1st Marquess of Ripon (1827–1909)
 Frederick Oliver Robinson, 2nd Marquess of Ripon (1852–1923)

References

 
 
Extinct marquessates in the Peerage of the United Kingdom
Ripon
1871 establishments in England
1923 disestablishments in England
Noble titles created in 1871
Noble titles created for UK MPs
History of Yorkshire